Sant'Antioco is the name of both an island and a municipality (comune) in southwestern Sardinia, in the Province of South Sardinia, in Sulcis zone. With a population of 11,730, the municipality of Sant'Antioco it is the island's largest community. It is also the site of ancient Sulci, considered the second city of Sardinia in antiquity.

Island of Sant'Antioco

The island is divided between the two municipalities of Sant'Antioco and Calasetta. Other settlements are the small tourist resort of Maladroxia (a frazione of Sant'Antioco municipality) and Cussorgia, part of Calasetta. The coast of the island is in part sandy and in part rocky. The main beaches in the island are Maladroxia and Coaquaddus, in the municipality of Sant'Antioco, and Sotto Torre, Le Saline and Spiaggia Grande in the municipality of Calasetta.

History

The island of Sant'Antioco was settled at least from the 5th millennium BC (the so-called culture of San Michele of Ozieri), which was based mainly on fishing and agriculture. Typical tombs (called domus de janas) and menhirs belonging to this culture have been found. The island also housed the nuragic civilization: findings include the Giants' grave of Su Niu de su Crobu ("Crow's Nest").

In the 8th century BC the Phoenicians founded a new settlement, with the name of Sulky (Punic:) or Solki, of which a tophet (children) necropolis has been excavated. Later (6th century BC) it became a Carthaginian colony, to which another necropolis belongs. The Punic domination ended in the 3rd century BC, when Sulky was conquered by the Romans, who connected it to the mainland through an artificial isthmus. During the civil war between Julius Caesar and Pompey it sided with the latter, being severely punished after his defeat. During Roman times, it was called Plumbaria, after its lead deposits.

The current city name derives from St. Antiochus, evangelizer of the area, who was martyred in 125 AD. After the decline and the end of the Western Roman Empire, Sant'Antioco was a fortified strong point of the Byzantines. It was repeatedly attacked by the Saracens starting from the early 8th century, and gradually abandoned by the inhabitants who fled to the more protected inner area; the island mainly remained important as the end of pilgrimages devoted to St. Antiochus. A new settlement (bidda in Sardinian) was established around 935 by the judge (the local title for lord) of Cagliari, but this also was abandoned after the end of the giudicato. The island was a territory of the Kingdom of Sardinia (created in 1324) and later was acquired by archbishopric of Cagliari (1503) and, in 1758, by the religious Order of SS. Maurizio and Lazzaro. In the 18th century the area began to be repopulated and toward the mid of the century there were 38 houses, 15 workshops, and 164 huts, with some 450 inhabitants.

In January–May 1793 the island was occupied by French troops under admiral Laurent Jean François Truguet, and the citizens freed from ecclesiastical taxes. The last attack by North African pirates occurred in 1815; the same year in which the relics of the patron saint were brought back to the cathedral.

Main sights
The Palaeo-Christian Basilica of Sant'Antioco, restored in 1089–1102 with its catacombs
Roman bridge
Roman fountain
Ancient acropolis
Phoenician and Punic necropolises
Tophet
Hypogeal village
Ferruccio Barreca Archaeological Museum
The Forte Su Pisu (1812)

Events
In the period from 15 May to 15 June a famous tuna "mattanza" is held, with fishing of Atlantic bluefin tuna (Thunnus thynnus).

Gallery

See also
 List of islands of Italy

References

External links

 Sant'Antioco cultural site

Islands of Sardinia
Populated places established in the 8th century BC
Populated coastal places in Italy